The 2018 Lyon Open (also known as the Open Parc Auvergne-Rhône-Alpes Lyon) was a men's tennis tournament played on outdoor clay courts. It was the second edition of the Lyon Open and part of the ATP World Tour 250 series of the 2018 ATP World Tour. It took place in the city of Lyon, France, from May 20 through May 26, 2018.

Singles main draw entrants

Seeds 

 Rankings are as of May 14, 2018.

Other entrants 
The following players received wildcards into the singles main draw:
  Grégoire Barrère 
  Adrian Mannarino 
  Corentin Moutet

The following players received entry from the qualifying draw:
  Laslo Đere 
  José Hernández-Fernández
  Filip Horanský
  Jordi Samper-Montaña

The following players received entry as lucky losers:
  Federico Coria
  Joris De Loore

Withdrawals 
Before the tournament
  Chung Hyeon → replaced by  Joris De Loore
  Karen Khachanov → replaced by  Cameron Norrie
  Leonardo Mayer → replaced by  Mikhail Kukushkin
  Daniil Medvedev → replaced by  Dušan Lajović
  Viktor Troicki → replaced by  Calvin Hemery
  Jo-Wilfried Tsonga → replaced by  Federico Coria

Doubles main draw entrants

Seeds

 Rankings are as of May 14, 2018.

Other entrants
The following pairs received wildcards into the doubles main draw:
  Grégoire Barrère /  Tristan Lamasine
  Jonathan Eysseric /  Hugo Nys

Finals

Singles

  Dominic Thiem defeated  Gilles Simon, 3–6, 7–6(7–2), 6–1

Doubles

  Nick Kyrgios /  Jack Sock defeated  Roman Jebavý /  Matwé Middelkoop, 7–5, 2–6, [11–9]

References

2018
2018 ATP World Tour
2018 in French tennis
May 2018 sports events in France